Badagada Government High School, Bhubaneswar, is a high school in the capital city of Bhubaneswar, Odisha. The school was started in 1963 by the Government of Odisha. It is considered as one of the oldest government schools in the city of Bhubaneswar along with Capital High School, Bhubaneswar, which was established a decade before it. In 2013, Badagada Government High School, Bhubaneswar celebrated its Golden Jubilee. The school is located at the corner of old village called Badagada and a new housing complex built by Bhubaneswar Development Authority (BDA).

Description 

The school is strategically located at the corner of old village called Badagada and a new housing complex built by Bhubaneswar Development Authority (BDA). It is called Badagada BRIT Colony. BRIT stands for Bhubaneswar Regional Improvement Trust which was the initial version of BDA.

Badagada High School is a Government of Odisha owned high school in the capital city of Bhubaneswar. It is led by a headmaster, but effective administration and the budget are the responsibility of the Department of School & Mass Education, Government of Odisha.

The school has classes from 6th grade to 10th grade. It is affiliated to the Board of Secondary Education, Odisha of the Government of Odisha, which conducts the terminal 10th grade examination.

The typical class size is 50.

Teachers are appointed by the Government of Odisha.

Headmasters 

These headmasters have served Badagada High School.

Gallery

Notable alumni
 Saraju Mohanty, professor and director at University of North Texas, US

See also
 Puri Zilla School
 Secondary Board High School

References

Schools in Bhubaneswar
Educational institutions established in 1963
1963 establishments in Orissa